South Stoke could be one of the following places in England:

South Stoke, Lincolnshire  - old name for Stoke Rochford
South Stoke, Oxfordshire
South Stoke, Somerset
South Stoke, West Sussex

See also

North Stoke (disambiguation)
East Stoke (disambiguation)
Stoke (disambiguation)